Ørland is a municipality in Trøndelag county, Norway. It is part of the Fosen region. Ørland is located at the southwestern tip of the Fosen peninsula at the northern shore of the mouth of Trondheimsfjord where the Stjørnfjorden arm begins. The administrative centre of the municipality is the village of Bjugn. Other larger settlements in Ørland include Brekstad (which declared itself to be a town in 2005), Uthaug, Opphaug, Ottersbo, Høybakken, Jøssund, Lysøysundet, Nes, Oksvoll, and Vallersund.

The  municipality is the 220th largest by area out of the 356 municipalities in Norway. Ørland is the 110th most populous municipality in Norway with a population of 10,371.

General information

The municipality of Ørland was established on 1 January 1838 (see formannskapsdistrikt law). In 1853, the northern district of Bjugn was separated to become a municipality of its own. This left Ørland with 3,361 residents. On 1 January 1896, the southern district of Værnes was separated from Ørland to become the municipality of Agdenes. After the division, Ørland had 3,649 residents and it was just a fraction of its original size.

On 1 January 2018, the municipality switched from the old Sør-Trøndelag county to the new Trøndelag county.

On 1 January 2020, the municipalities of Ørland and Bjugn merged to form a new municipality called Ørland with its administrative centre located at Botngård.

Name
The municipality (originally the parish) is named "Ørland". During the 16th century, the suffix  (which means "land") was added. In 1590, the name was spelled , and by the 1700s, the name was standardized to Ørlandet, although the -et part was later dropped.

Coat of arms
The coat of arms was granted on 9 February 1979. The official blazon is "Party per bend sinister argent and sable". This means the arms have a field (background) that is divided diagonally from the bottom left to the top right. The left side of the line has a tincture of argent which means it is commonly colored white, but if it is made out of metal, then silver is used. The right side of the line has a tincture of black. The design is derived from the historic coat of arms of Inger, Lady of Austraat, a noblewoman from the Rømer family who lived at the Austrått manor in Ørland from 1488 to 1555. She played a major role in the history of the area. She was later portrayed by Henrik Ibsen in his play Lady Inger of Ostrat. The arms were designed by Hallvard Trætteberg. The municipal flag has the same design as the coat of arms.

Churches
The Church of Norway has four parishes within the municipality of Ørland. It is part of the Fosen prosti (deanery) in the Diocese of Nidaros.

Geography

Ørland is on the Norwegian mainland, situated on the northern shore of the mouth of the Trondheimsfjord, and is largely flat lowland. Ørland faces the Norwegian Sea to the west with Trondheimsfjord and the mouth of the Stjørnfjord to the east. Ørland's topography differs markedly from most other areas in Norway. The municipality also includes three inhabited islands (Garten, Kråkvåg and Storfosna) as well as many islets. The Kjeungskjær lighthouse lies at the mouth of the Bjugnfjorden in the northeastern part of the municipality.

Fosenheia, a peak south of Storfosna, is also highly visible in the landscape. 
The Convention on Wetlands, called the Ramsar Convention, is an intergovernmental treaty that provides the framework for national action and international cooperation for the conservation and wise use of wetlands and their resources. Ørland has four Ramsar areas: Grandefjæra nature conservancy, and the wildlife protection areas of Hovsfjæra, Innstrandfjæra, and Kråkvågsvaet, all of which are significant for seabirds, wading birds and migratory birds. The area around Rusasetvatnet is important for bird life. Austråttlunden landscape conservancy also has protected status.

Climate

Ørland has a very mild climate for the latitude, albeit at times windy. Ørland is one of the northernmost locations to have a mild enough winter and long enough summer to fulfill all criteria as a temperate oceanic climate (Cfb). The all-time high is  recorded July 28, 2019. The warmest month on record is August 2002 with mean  and average daily high . The coldest month on record is February 1966 with mean  and average daily low . The average date for the last overnight freeze (low below ) in spring is April 27  and average date for first freeze in autumn is October 21 (1981-2010 average)  giving a frost-free season of 176 days. The prevailing wind direction is from the southwest, a wind sometimes accompanied by precipitation. Snow rarely remains after 3–4 days in the town  Brekstad and other coastal areas of the municipality. However, in the eastern parts of the municipality the snow remains longer making possible skiing and other winter activities at the lighted track near the Yrjar ski cabin. The weather station is located at Ørland Main Air Station

Government
All municipalities in Norway, including Ørland, are responsible for primary education (through 10th grade), outpatient health services, senior citizen services, unemployment and other social services, zoning, economic development, and municipal roads. The municipality is governed by a municipal council of elected representatives, which in turn elect a mayor. The municipality falls under the Trøndelag District Court and the Frostating Court of Appeal.

Municipal council
The municipal council of Ørland is made up of 35 representatives that are elected to four year terms. The party breakdown of the council is as follows:

Mayors
The mayors of Ørland:

1838-1841: Augustinius Gaarder 
1842-1845: Rasmus Gaarder
1846-1849: Eiler Hagerup Nannestad 
1850-1853: Rasmus Gaarder 
1854-1857: Eiler Hagerup Nannestad 
1857-1859: Jacob C. Uthaug 
1860-1864: Johan Nicolai Franzen  
1865-1865: Johan Arnt Vik
1866-1869: Jonas Angell
1870-1877: Ole Wiggen 
1878-1879: Carl Grann
1880-1881: Hans Aage Uthaug
1882-1916: Jakob T. Hoff (V)
1917-1928: Peder Næsset (Bp)
1929-1934: Per J. Gjelvold (Bp)
1935-1940: Leiv Aas (V)
1941-1945: Harald A. Dahl (Bp/NS)
1945-1951: Leiv Aas (V)
1952-1963: Akim Murvold (Sp)
1964-1969: Johan Bakken (Sp)
1970-1973: Alf Bjørkum (V)
1974-1975: Leif Johan Lyngstad (H)
1976-1983: Oddbjørn Hågård (Sp)
1984-1987: Einar Løkra (Sp)
1988-1989: Turid Skogstad (Ap)
1990-1997: Oddvar Hoøen (Sp)
1997-1999: Hallgeir Grøntvedt (Sp)
1999-2003: Knut Ring (Ap)
2003-2015: Hallgeir Grøntvedt (Sp)
2015-2022: Tom Myrvold (H)
2022-present: Ogne Undertun (Ap)

Economy
Major occupations are the Ørland Air Base, part of the Royal Norwegian Air Force; agriculture; industry, public services; and commerce.

The largest employer of the Fosen peninsula is the military air force base located in Ørland municipality. In 2013 about 650 employees and 254 drafted soldiers worked at the base. With the upgrade of the base it is estimated that the base will have 1070 employees and 565 drafted soldiers in 2020. Ørland Air Base is currently one of two main air force bases in Norway. The Norwegian parliament decided in 2012 to concentrate most of fighter planes at one base: Ørland. The base is currently in the process of upgrading to be able to operate Norway's new fighter jet, the F-35 Joint Strike Fighter. Fifty-two planes are to be acquired from Lockheed Martin, most of which will be stationed in Ørland. Ørland is also operating Westland Sea King search and rescue helicopters as well as being a forward operations location of NATO's surveillance plane the E-3/AWACS. The Norwegian F-16 Immediate Reaction Force is stationed at Ørland along with support and administration.

Mascot Høie, established in 1986, is the largest industrial employer in the municipality. The company produces duvets, pillows, blankets duvet covers and bed linens. Headquarters are located in Brekstad, Ørland and employs about 100.

Grøntvedt Pelagic, established in 1988, employs around 100 and processes herring, mackerel and other pelagic species in their factories in Uthaug and Kråkvåg. The company is the world's largest producer of barrel-marinated herring.

In 2010, agriculture employed about 8% of the population of Ørland and the sector is dominating the landscape of Ørland. The most important products were milk, grain and meat. Ørland Cheese and Milk Factory closed its doors in 2011. Ørland Savings Bank was established in 1849, only 26 years after the first of its kind in Norway (in Christiania). The bank is an independent bank, but is part of Eika-Gruppen.

Ørland is a regional center for both shopping and business services. In the city of Brekstad shoppers can visit and enjoy several clothing stores, grocery stores, cafes, lumber, and hardware stores, goldsmiths, flower shop, convenience stores, sports stores, gift stores, restaurants, optometry store, health food store, drug store, Asian grocery store, bookshop, banks, office supply, pet supplies, paint store, art galleries, furniture store, bakeries, car dealers and liquor store.
Business services like accountants, attorneys, banks, consultants, advertising agencies, office supplies, auditing, print shops, collection agency and office services are readily available.

Transportation and communication
Passenger ferries run between Brekstad and Trondheim eight times each direction on weekdays (reduced service on weekends). This makes commuting convenient and many commute to and from Trondheim for work or studies on a daily basis. Several employees of the air force live outside of Ørland. There is a daily weekday average of about 900 passengers – 400 of which travels to or from Hitra/Frøya or Kristiansund.

Automobile ferry service connects Brekstad to Valset in Agdenes municipality. This connection is a part of Norwegian County Road 710 (Fv 710) from Orkanger to Krinsvatn. On weekdays the ferry departs every 30 minutes during rush hour; hourly the rest of the day.

Air Norway is an airline owned by Ørland municipality, Nordic Air AS and North Flying AS. The company operates direct flights between Ørland and Oslo Airport, Gardermoen as well continuation of flight to Aalborg, Denmark.

In 1923, the island of Garten was connected to the mainland by bridge. The bridge between the two islands of Storfosna and Kråkvåg opened in 2003. A ferry connects Garten to Storfosna. The ferry also connects Garten and Storfosna with Leksa and Værnes in Agdenes municipality across the Trondheim Fjord.

Good electronic communications is available via fiber network to most residents in Brekstad and the towns of Uthaug and Opphaug while ADSL/VDSL is available everywhere else. Mobile G4 service is available in most of Ørland.

Education and health services
The municipality has two recently renovated public primary schools: Opphaug skole (which serves the villages of Opphaug, Ottersbo and Uthaug) and Hårberg skole (which serves the city of Brekstad as well as the villages of Beian, Garten, Grande, Kråkvåg, Rønne, and Storfosna). A new primary school in Brekstad is planned completed by the school year starting in 2017. Middle school kids attend a school renovated in 2009: Ørland ungdomsskole in Brekstad. Most high school students attend Fosen videregående skole in nearby Botngård.

For preschool children, the municipality offers services at Futura and Borgen childcare centers. The private childcare centers Marihøna Music and Outdoors childcare center, Teletun Nature- and Farm childcare center and Solblomsten Steiner childcare center.

The municipal health services are located in Ørland Medical Center (Ørland Medisinske Senter)/ Fosen Helse IKS/Fosen DMS. The center has developed from being a health clinic and birthing center founded and run by the Norwegian Women's Public Health Association (N.K.S) to a health care center that offers a wide range of services. The municipality has one of the largest offering within decentralized health services in Norway: emergency room, health promotion and disease prevention center, cancer coordinators, mental health services, psychologist, X-ray services, dermatologist, phototherapy, endocrinology (stomach and intestinal diseases), otorhinolaryngology (ear, nose and throat), gynecology, surgery, orthopedics. In addition, the center offers services such as specialized rehabilitation, ambulance, midwife and ophthalmologist.

Attractions
Major attractions are the Ramsar Convention Bird Protection areas, the coastal areas themselves, and the Manor of Austrått, dated 1656 and with a known history from around 1000 AD. Other attractions are the single, large Sessile oak (the northernmost in the world, known as Austråtteika) in the nearby forest; and the fortifications of the triple  gun turret from World War II, which is now open to public viewing.

History
Archaeological digs has shown that Ørland has been a regional center at least starting at the Iron Age. One of the longhouses found has a unique structure, believed to have served a special purpose, for example a court, customs house or assembly hall. Excavation ongoing  for expansion of the airport revealed post holes for long houses and a large midden (rubbish pile), giving detailed information about how the inhabitants lived.

A hillfort from the Migration Period (about 500 A.D.) similarly shows that there must have been something to defend in the area. The hillfort is located on Borgklinten, east of Ottersbo and Austrått. Due to Ørlands geographical location at the entrance of the Trondheim fjord it must have been a strategically important place for the exercise of power or to control trade.

Austrått Manor is the municipality's most important historical building. Austrått has been the site of a manor or royal estate since about 1000 A.D. and several historical figures have been associated with the place. At the time of the Battle of Stiklestad, Finn Árnasson was lord of Austrått. His wife was Bergljot  (Bergljót Halvdansdóttir),  niece of  Kings Harald Hardrada and Olaf II of Norway. Finn's daughter Ingibiorg Finnsdottir became the wife of Thorfinn, earl of the Orkney Islands.
  
Lady Inger of Austrått (1473–1555) was at the time Norway's most prominent woman. Through inheritance, use of force and other methods Lady Inger increased her wealth and controlled vast land areas. After the death of her husband, Niels Henrikssøn (ca. 1458–1523), she had strong political and economical influence. Henrik Ibsen's romantic portrayal of her as an idealistic freedom fighter is probably not accurate. It is believed that Lady Inger and Niels started what later Ove Bjelke completed: the Austrått Manor. Ove Bjelke (1611–1674) built Austrått Manor the way we see it today. It is a manor with a sense of symmetry and symbols of power and inspired by the builder's time as a student in Italy. The complex, which was built around a church from the Middle Ages, was probably completed around 1656. The manor was consumed by a fire in 1916, but was later restored—a process which was completed in 1961.

Storfosen Manor (Storfosen Gods) also has a long history dating at least as far back as the 12th century. This manor was a royal estate in the 14th century, but was for the next 300 years part of the land holdings of the rulers at Austrått. Lady Inger lived here as a widow. The property is still amongst the biggest farms in the county. Ruins of a 14th-century chapel is located on the property. The manor changed hands in 2014; the new owners are developing the manor into a hotel.

Uthaug Manor (Uthaugsgården) owned by the Lund family from 1829, developed throughout the 19th century to become a full-fledged trading company comprising trade in fish and other commodities as well as a guesthouse, post office, telegraph and a steamship terminal. The place is today occupied by Museet Uthaugsgården and is unique due to the preservation of many rooms and items in their original condition.

At the same time Ørland was the center for a large coastal district with a district judge and tax collector. The district comprised the area from Hemne to Osen including islands to the west. Starting in 1837 the church parish and the municipality included what is today Ørland, Bjugn and the northern parts of Agdenes municipalities. The Savings bank, established in 1849, covered the same area. In 1853, Bjugn incorporated as a separate municipality. Ørland got its present-day shape and size when Agdenes incorporated into its own municipality in 1896.

The people of Ørland has for generations made their living as coastal farmers who combined farming, coastal fishing, and seasonal work at the fishing grounds further out. Ørland has had its own cheese and milk factory since 1878 and a grain mill predating written records. Later fish processing has been part of the mix.

With the arrival of the 20th century came new problems and new opportunities. The German occupation was a boom time for workers who built the airport. The airport changed the landscape significantly. Several prison camps, in places like Austrått, Uthaug and Hovde, made a strong impression on the population leading to Fosen being a key area for Norwegian-Yugoslav relations. After the war, in 1954, the airport reopened as a NATO facility. The establishment of the airport the air force became a good opportunity for jobs and careers for the locals. , the Ørland air force base is the biggest employer in the Fosen. The military employees are often in relationships where both partners have high income jobs.

Ørland had its own dairy school from 1894 to 2001, school of home economics since 1923 and vocational school since 1960. The latter two were merged into the Fosen videregående skole in 2000.

Sister Cities
Ørland has sister city agreements with:

Notable people 

 John Aalberg (born 1960)- Norwegian born American skier
 Håkon Grjotgardsson (ca.860–870 – ca.900–920) the first Earl of Lade; ally of Harald Fairhair, King of Norway; lived in Ørland
 Otte Rømer (ca.1330–1409) a nobleman, state councilor and landowner; established his family ownership of the Austrått estate
 Inger Ottesdotter Rømer (ca.1475–1555) the wealthiest landowner in Norway, ultimate heiress of the noble Rømer family and a political intriguer
 Peter Høier Holtermann (1820 in Austrått – 1865) a Norwegian architect
 Jørleif Uthaug (1911 in Brekstad – 1990) a Norwegian illustrator, painter and sculptor
 Oddbjørn Hågård (1940 in Ørland – 2013) a Norwegian politician, Mayor of Ørland 1975–1983
 Hallgeir Grøntvedt (born 1959) a Norwegian politician, Mayor of Ørland 1997–1999 and 2003–2015
 Tom Nordtvedt (born 1963) a retired Paralympic swimmer and twice silver medallist, lives in Ørland
 Jo Tessem (born 1972 in Brekstad) a Norwegian footballer with over 400 club caps

Media gallery

References

External links

Municipal fact sheet from Statistics Norway 

 
Municipalities of Trøndelag
1838 establishments in Norway